The Big Three is the nickname of the three most successful sports clubs in Peru. The football teams of Alianza Lima, Sporting Cristal, and Universitario have a great rivalry and are usually the main contenders for the title. Combined they share a total of 71 out of 107 Peruvian Football Championships ever played and generally end up sharing the top three positions. 

Several other clubs outside the big three have won the Peruvian league, with Sport Boys having the fourth most national titles behind the Big Three in Peru with 6 in total. Today, the chief competitors of the three are Melgar, Cienciano and Deportivo Municipal.

Titles by club

Title definitions

List of finals

Other definitions
These matches were played when teams were tied for first in the general league or in a specific tournament.

Half-year tournaments

Apertura / Fase 1 seasons

Clausura / Fase 2 seasons

Regional seasons

Parallel tournaments

Total Half-year tournaments by club

Total International Participations by club

Performances by club

See also 
 Big Three (Belgium)
 Big Three (Costa Rica)
 Big Three (Greece)
 Big Three (Netherlands)
 Big Three (Portugal)
 Big Three (Turkey)

References 

Football in Peru
Alianza Lima
Sporting Cristal
Club Universitario de Deportes